C/MRI (Computer/Model Railroad Interface) is a set of electronic modules that allow a computer to monitor and control real world devices, including those used in conjunction with model railroads.

C/MRI was first introduced by Bruce Chubb in the February 1985 issue of the Model Railroader magazine.  It appeared again with a four-part series starting with the January 2004 issue titled “Signaling Made Easier.” This series is considered to provide a good and concise introduction to the C/MRI and its application to signaling. Additionally, The Sunset Valley Oregon System (Bruce's home model railroad layout) was featured in the February and March 2006 issues of Model Railroader and the 2006 issue of Model Railroad Planning as well as in the March 2007 issue of the NMRA's magazine, Scale Rails.

In addition to the above magazine articles, there are several books by Bruce Chubb on the subject:

 Build your own Universal Computer Interface (out of print, first edition)
 Paperback: 320 pages
 Publisher: Tab Books (February 1989)
 
  (pbk.)
 

 Build your own Universal Computer Interface (out of print, second edition)
 Paperback: 410 pages
 Publisher: McGraw-Hill (1997)
  (hc)
  (pbk.)
 The Railroader's C/MRI Applications Handbook (version 2.1, 1999)
 Spiral bound, 8.5x11 paper: ~250 pages
 Self-published by JLC Enterprises, Grand Rapids, MI
 The Railroader's C/MRI Applications Handbook (version 2.2, 2000)
 Spiral bound, 8.5x11 paper: ~250 pages
 Self-published by JLC Enterprises, Grand Rapids, MI

 The Computer/Model Railroad Interface (C/MRI) Users Manual (version 3.0, 2003)
 Spiral bound, 8.5x11 paper: ~250 pages
 Self-published by JLC Enterprises, Grand Rapids, MI
 The Computer/Model Railroad Interface (C/MRI) Users Manual (version 3.0, 2003)
 Appendices
 Spiral bound, 8.5x11 paper: ~75 pages
 Self-published by JLC Enterprises, Grand Rapids, MI
 The Railroader's C/MRI Applications Handbook (version 3.0, 2010)
 Volume 1-System Extensions
 Spiral bound, 8.5x11 paper: ~250 pages
 Self-published by JLC Enterprises, Grand Rapids, MI
 The Railroader's C/MRI Applications Handbook (version 3.0, 2010)
 Volume 2-Signaling Systems
 Spiral bound, 8.5x11 paper: ~250 pages
 Self-published by JLC Enterprises, Grand Rapids, MI

External links
JLC Enterprises website

Rail transport modelling